Croft Historic District is a national historic district located near Charlotte, Mecklenburg County, North Carolina. The district encompasses seven contributing buildings and one contributing structure in the crossroads community of Croft in rural Mecklenburg County.  Contributing resources include the S. W. & C. S. Davis
General Store (1908), two-story Queen Anne style S. W. Davis House (1903) and flower house (c. 1903), the old Croft School (c. 1890, c. 1912), three warehouses (c. 1910, c. 1925, and c. 1930), and a section of the (former) Atlantic. Tennessee and Ohio Railroad Tracks (1871).

It was added to the National Register of Historic Places in 1999.

References

Historic districts on the National Register of Historic Places in North Carolina
Queen Anne architecture in North Carolina
Houses completed in 1903
Buildings and structures in Mecklenburg County, North Carolina
National Register of Historic Places in Mecklenburg County, North Carolina